Accel Schools, styled ACCEL Schools, is a for-profit education management organization that operates forty charter schools primarily in Ohio. Accel schools have operated on significantly lower budgets than other Cleveland schools.

History
Since 2014, it has taken over schools operated by I Can, Mosaica Education, and White Hat Management.

Performance
Accel Schools has done well in rankings in Cleveland, not so well in Sandusky.

Schools

Colorado
Banning Lewis Preparatory Academy

Ohio
Akron Preparatory School, Akron, Ohio
Cleveland Arts and Sciences Academy
Cleveland Preparatory Academy, Cleveland, Ohio
Columbus Arts & Technology Academy, Columbus, Ohio, K-12
Constellation Schools Cleveland, Ohio K-12
Foundation Academy, Mansfield, Ohio
Lincoln Park Academy, Cleveland, Ohio, K-8
Monroe Preparatory Academy, Sandusky, Ohio
Northeast Ohio College Preparatory School
Northwest Academy, Cleveland, Ohio, K-8
OHDELA, Akron, Ohio
Riverside Academy, Cincinnati, Ohio
Star Academy, Toledo, Ohio
STEAM Academy of Warrensville Heights, Warrensville Heights, Ohio, K-8
University Academy, Akron, Ohio
West Park Academy, Cleveland, Ohio, K-8

Illinois

Michigan
Global Preparatory Academy, Roseville, Michigan
Inkster Preparatory Academy, Inkster, Michigan

Minnesota
North Metro Flex Academy, North St. Paul, Minnesota

References

Companies based in Fairfax County, Virginia
Education companies of the United States
Education management organizations
American companies established in 2014
2014 establishments in Ohio
Charter management organizations